Quiero Ser (1981) is Menudo's ninth Spanish album and the second one released in 1981, featuring Ricky Meléndez, René Farrait, Johnny Lozada, Xavier Serbiá and Miguel Cancel.  With this album, their popularity started rising all over Latin America.

Track listing

(*) in Dominican Republic and Mexico: "Súbete a Mi Moto",  in Puerto Rico, Sube a mi Motora, in Brasil (Long Play and Tape) "Menudo Mania": "Sobe em Minha Moto", sung in Brazilian Portuguese by Ricky Meléndez and in English Motorcycle Dreamer first recorded by Miguel Cancel and then Ricky Meléndez in the album “Reaching Out”.

Personnel
Adapted from album back cover

Javier Romeu - Drums
Manuel Aguilar - Bass
José Ganoza - Rhythm 
Carlos Villa - Guitar
Rafael Martínez - Guitar
Alejandro Monroy - Piano

References

Menudo (band) albums
1981 albums